Al Hazm District is a district of the Al Jawf Governorate, Yemen. As of 2003, the district had a population of 30,952 inhabitants. The capital lies at Al Hazm.

On 15 July 2020, a Saudi airstrike in Al Hazm killed seven civilians.

References

Districts of Al Jawf Governorate